Javanmardi Rural District is in the Central District of Khanmirza County, Chaharmahal and Bakhtiari province, Iran. At the census of 2006, its population was 9,642 in 2,022 households, when it was in the former Khanmirza District of Lordegan County, and before the district was elevated to the status of a county. There were 10,015 inhabitants in 2,462 households at the following census of 2011; and in the most recent census of 2016, the population of the rural district was 10,775 in 3,102 households. The largest of its 13 villages was Bagh-e Behzad, with 2,454 people.

References 

Khanmirza County

Rural Districts of Chaharmahal and Bakhtiari Province

Populated places in Chaharmahal and Bakhtiari Province

Populated places in Khanmirza County